Roseburg is a city in the U.S. state of Oregon. It is in the Umpqua River Valley in southern Oregon and is the county seat and most populous city of Douglas County. Founded in 1851, the population was 23,683 at the 2020 census, making it the principal city of the Roseburg, Oregon Micropolitan Statistical Area. The community developed along both sides of the South Umpqua River and is traversed by Interstate 5. Traditionally a lumber industry town, Roseburg was the original home of Roseburg Forest Products, which is now based in nearby Springfield.

Natural resources 
Waterfalls near Roseburg include Susan Creek Falls and Fall Creek Falls. Roseburg's primary industries include timber and tourism, and the region is home to many vineyards and more than 30 wineries.

The Oregon Department of Fish & Wildlife lists more than 50 areas for fishing for salmon, steelhead, bass, bluegill and trout in the Roseburg area.

History 
Modern-day Roseburg is located on the lands of numerous Indian tribes, including the Cow Creek Band of the Umpqua Tribe, whose Cow Creek Umpqua Indian Foundation is located in Roseburg. Roseburg was the site of the 1855 Battle of Hungry Hill, part of the Rogue River Wars of 1855–56, fought between several southern Oregon Indian groups and the US Army.

The city was named for settler Aaron Rose, who established a homestead within the current city limits on September 23, 1851. Rose was born in 1813 in Ulster County, New York. In 1851, he came to Oregon from Coldwater, Michigan, where he had lived since 1837.

Rose constructed the first building in what would become Roseburg, a rough structure made of poles and clapboards with a front room about 16 or 18 feet square; it was used as a grocery store, backed by a dining room and kitchen. Originally, guests could use the floor of the front room to spread their beds or were able to sleep out of doors under nearby oak trees. His first structure served as a roadside inn and tavern for many years. Rose built a proper hotel in 1853. He died in 1899.

Roseburg was first known as Deer Creek because it was at the confluence of Deer Creek and the South Umpqua River. In 1854, voters chose Roseburg as the county seat over rival town Winchester. Rose donated  of land and $1,000 for the building of the county courthouse, and the important buildings of Winchester were moved to Roseburg before 1860.

Deer Creek post office was established in 1852, and the name changed to "Roseburgh" in 1857. The spelling was changed to "Roseburg" in 1894. Roseburg was incorporated by the Oregon Legislative Assembly on October 3, 1872.

Timber Capital of the Nation
The fortunes of Roseburg grew with the lumber industry. In 1937, Roseburg Lumber opened. Founded by Kenneth Ford, the company became the major employer in the community. Other major employers, including Weyerhaeuser, Champion and Sun Studs also developed and grew during this time. By the 1970s Roseburg branded itself as the Timber Capital of the Nation.

Country singer Johnny Cash mythologized Roseburg loggers in the 1960 song  "Lumberjack”:

"Ride this train to Roseburg, Oregon. Now there's a town for you!
You talk about rough...
You know a lot of places in the country claim Paul Bunyon lived there.
But you should have seen Roseburg when me and my daddy come there.
Every one of them loggers looked like Paul Bunyon to me.”

Roseburg Blast
On August 7, 1959, at approximately 1:00 a.m., the Gerretsen Building Supply Company caught fire. Firefighters soon arrived at the building, near Oak and Pine Streets, to extinguish the fire. Earlier in the evening, a truck driver for the Pacific Powder Company, George Rutherford, had parked his explosives truck in front of the building, which was not noticed. The truck exploded at around 1:14 a.m., destroying buildings in an eight-block radius and severely damaging 30 more blocks.

The truck was loaded with two tons of dynamite and four-and-a-half tons of the blasting agent nitro carbo nitrate. Rutherford had parked the truck after arranging his delivery for the following morning, despite warnings given to the Pacific Powder Company two days earlier not to leave such trucks unattended or park them in "congested areas". A police officer named Donald De Sues and the Chief of Police were on site and managed to evacuate citizens from the area of the truck before the explosion. Donald De Sues and the town Assistant Fire Chief were recognized as heroes that day and were both killed in the blast. A total of fourteen people died in the blast and fire, and 125 were injured. Damage was estimated at 10 to 12 million dollars; the powder company was eventually made to pay $1.2 million in civil damages, but was acquitted of criminal wrongdoing.

Roseburg's downtown was rebuilt, primarily by businesses using money collected from insurance claims. The city built a new bridge over the South Umpqua River on parcels affected by the disaster. Since the incident, it is commonly referred to as the Roseburg Blast or simply "The Blast". In 2005, SOPTV produced a documentary examining the Blast and the experiences of those who were involved or witnessed it, entitled The Roseburg Blast: A Catastrophe and Its Heroes.

Mass shooting

On October 1, 2015, students at Umpqua Community College near Roseburg were attacked by a 26-year-old gunman that had recently moved to the area from Southern California, who killed nine people (eight students and an assistant professor) and injured nine others. The gunman, a student at the school, committed suicide following a gun battle with police. This was the second school shooting in the Roseburg area, the other being a 2006 shooting at Roseburg High School. On October 9, President Barack Obama privately visited families of victims of the shooting. Hundreds of local residents protested the visit due to Obama's support of gun control legislation. In 1968, Bobby Kennedy had given a speech in Roseburg advocating for gun control for the mentally ill and for those with a "long criminal record" of murder.

Geography

Its highest point is Mount Nebo, a  hill to the west of Interstate 5. Through the 1980s, it was known for its band of 10-20 feral angora goats. Residents said they could predict the weather by watching where the goats were on the mountain; if they were high, the weather would be good. If rain was pending, the goats moved to lower levels. Because the goats wandered across the freeway for grazing, they were a risk to traffic. In the 1980s, they were rounded up and placed for adoption.

Climate
Roseburg has a Mediterranean climate (Köppen Csb borderline with Csa) with cool, rainy winters and very warm, dry summers. In a typical year, there are 27 days where the temperature reaches or exceeds , and two days with a temperature of or above . No other day has fallen to or below , and by the 1981 to 2010 average only 28 mornings fall below freezing.

In the summer, the area has little or no precipitation and plentiful sunshine — on average, 73.5 percent of days in July, August and September are at least partly sunny. There is also a much higher degree of diurnal temperature variation than in the winter. Roseburg averages  of rain per year, more than half of which falls between November and January.

Light dustings of snow can sometimes be seen, but accumulations are rare.

Demographics

2010 census
As of the census of 2010, there were 21,181 people, 9,081 households, and 5,177 families residing in the city. The racial makeup of the city was 91% White, 0.5% African American, 1.7% Native American, 1.6% Asian, 0.3% Pacific Islander, 1.4% from other races, and 3.5% from two or more races. Hispanic or Latino of any race were 5.5% of the population.

There were 9,081 households, of which 27.0% had children under the age of 18 living with them, 39.2% were married couples living together, 13.2% had a female householder with no husband present, 4.6% had a male householder with no wife present, and 43.0% were non-families. 35.5% of all households were made up of individuals, and 16.8% had someone living alone who was 65 years of age or older. The average household size was 2.23 and the average family size was 2.84.

The median age in the city was 41.1 years. 21.7% of residents were under the age of 18; 9.1% were between the ages of 18 and 24; 23.8% were from 25 to 44; 26.2% were from 45 to 64; and 19.1% were 65 years of age or older. The gender makeup of the city was 48.0% male and 52.0% female.

2000 census
As of the census of 2000, there were 20,017 people, 8,237 households, and 5,098 families residing in the city. The population density was 2,171.1 people per square mile (838.2/km). There were 8,838 housing units at an average density of 958.6 per square mile (370.1/km). The racial makeup of the city was 93.56% White, 0.3% African American, 1.3% Native American, 0.99% Asian, 0.1% Pacific Islander, 1.26% from other races, and 2.48% from two or more races. Hispanic or Latino of any race were 3.73% of the population.

There were 8,237 households, out of which 28.9% had children under the age of 18 living with them, 46.2% were married couples living together, 11.9% had a female householder with no husband present, and 38.1% were non-families. 31.6% of all households were made up of individuals, and 13.9% had someone living alone who was 65 years of age or older. The average household size was 2.32 and the average family size was 2.88.

In the city, the population was spread out, with 23.2% under the age of 18, 8.9% from 18 to 24, 26.5% from 25 to 44, 22.4% from 45 to 64, and 18.9% who were 65 years of age or older. The median age was 39 years. For every 100 females, there were 93.7 males. For every 100 females age 18 and over, there were 91.5 males.

The median income for a household in the city was $31,250, and the median income for a family was $40,172. Males had a median income of $32,624 versus $25,707 for females. The per capita income for the city was $17,082. About 11.0% of families and 15.1% of the population were below the poverty line, including 18.9% of those under age 18 and 9.2% of those age 65 or over.

Education

Primary and secondary public education in Roseburg are provided by the Roseburg School District. Umpqua Community College is the city's two-year college.

Economy

The unemployment rate in Roseburg is about 6.9 percent. During the Great Recession of 2009, the unemployment rate peaked at 16.5% before falling.  In 2012, the largest employer in the town was Roseburg Forest Products and Mercy Medical Center was the second largest.

Media
In 2018, the City of Roseburg opened its own library. Previously, the city's library had been part of the Douglas County Library System but was closed when county libraries lost public funding.

Newspapers
There are three newspapers serving Roseburg. The News-Review is published five days per week and is based in Roseburg.  The Roseburg Beacon is published weekly and serves Roseburg.  The Douglas County News is published weekly and is based in the nearby town of Sutherlin.

Radio
AM
KGRV 700  Religious
KTBR 950  JPR News and Information
KQEN 1240  News/Talk
KSKR 1490  Sports

FM
KMPQ 88.1  NPR Variety
KEAR 88.5  Family Radio – Religious
KLOV 89.3  K-Love – Contemporary Christian
KAWZ 90.7  CSN – Religious
KSRS 91.5  JPR Classics and News
KSMF 91.9  JPR Rhythm and News
KCNA 98.3  Classic Hits
KQUA  99.7 Community Radio
KSKR-FM 101.1  i101 – Top 40
KZEL-FM 102.1  Classic Rock
KRSB-FM 103.1  Country
KROG 103.7  Modern Rock
KKMX 104.5  Sam FM – Adult Hits
KYTT 105.5 Contemporary Christian
KLLF-LP 106.7  Religious

Television

Transportation

Roads
Oregon Route 99 runs through downtown Roseburg as the main north–south arterial. Interstate 5 runs along the west side of the city, across the South Umpqua River from downtown. 
Oregon Route 138 runs northwest from Roseburg to Elkton, Oregon, and generally east from Roseburg to its terminus at a junction with U.S. Route 97, just east of Diamond Lake and Crater Lake.

Buses
Roseburg and surrounding communities are regionally served by U-Trans (formerly Umpqua Transit), the local bus service. In 2017, these services were significantly expanded.

Greyhound Lines provide the community of Roseburg with more distant transportation.

Airports
There are two public airports, Marion E. Carl Memorial Field at the north end of town and George Felt Airport to the west.

Notable people

Mike Allred – comic book artist
Dave Archer  – artist, resident since 1999
H. Guy Bedwell – thoroughbred trainer in Racing Hall of Fame
Barbara Hibbs Blake  –  mammalogist
Tim Blixseth – real estate developer, songwriter, fraudster
Knute Buehler - Republican candidate in the 2018 Oregon Gubernatorial race
Jamie Burke – baseball player
Troy Calhoun – head coach of the United States Air Force Academy football team
Wes DeMott – author
Marion Eugene Carl – Marine Corps general and flying ace
Guy Cordon – U.S. Senator, Douglas County District Attorney, lawyer
Jeremy Guthrie – professional baseball pitcher
Bobby Henderson - founder of the Church of the Flying Spaghetti Monster
Tyler Hentschel – lead singer of Insomniac Folklore
David Hume Kennerly – presidential photographer for Gerald Ford, Pulitzer Prize winner
John Kitzhaber – Oregon governor, 1995–2003, 2011–2015
William W. Knight – publisher of The Oregon Journal and father of Phil Knight, the founder of Nike
Joseph Lane – general and early governor of Oregon, his home is now a museum in downtown Roseburg
Jason Latimer - magician and illusionist
Matthew Lessner – director and screenwriter
Lucy A. Rose Mallory - (1846–1920), editor; daughter of the founder of Roseburg, Aaron Rose
Shelley Plimpton – former actress and mother of actress Martha Plimpton
Barry Serafin – television journalist
Alek Skarlatos – Oregon Army National Guardsman, recipient of the Knights of the Legion of Honour
Craig Tanner – film director, producer, editor
Chris Thompson - 2000 Olympic bronze medalist in swimming, 1,500-meter freestyle
ZZ Ward – musician, singer, songwriter

Fictional Characters
Eliot Rosewater – philanthropist, firefighter, summer resident in 1970's

Sister cities
Roseburg has three sister cities:

 Aranda de Duero, Castile and León, Spain
 Kuki (formerly Shōbu), Saitama, Japan
 Kermanshah, Iran

See also
 Mill–Pine Neighborhood Historic District
 Roseburg North, Oregon

References

Further reading
 Stephen Dow Beckham, Land of the Umpqua: A History of Douglas County, Oregon. Roseburg, OR: Douglas County Commissioners, 1986.
 J.V. Chenoweth, Douglas County's Golden Age. Oakland, OR: Oakland Printing Co., 1972.
 Douglas County Historical Society, Historic Douglas County, Oregon, 1982. Roseburg, OR: Douglas County Historical Society, 1982.
 Douglas County Museum, Land of Umpqua. Charleston, SC: Arcadia Publishing, 2011.
 Diane L Goeres-Gardner, Roseburg. Charleston, SC: Arcadia Publishing, 2010.
 R.J. Guyer, Douglas County Chronicles: History from the Land of One Hundred Valleys. Charleston, SC: The History Press, 2013.
 Eli S. Hall, Then to Now with Roseburg Schools, 1854-1970. Portland, OR: Metropolitan Press, 1970.
 Norman A. Myers and Gerald W. Williams, Letters to Home: Life in CCC Camps of Douglas County, Oregon, 1933-1934. Roseburg, OR: USDA-Forest Service, Umpqua National Forest, 1983.
 Fred Reenstjerna and Jena Mitchell, Life in Douglas County, Oregon: The Western Experience. Roseburg, OR: Douglas County Museum, 1993.
 William G. Robbins, The Far Western Frontier: Economic Opportunity and Social Democracy in Early Roseburg, Oregon. PhD dissertation. University of Oregon, 1969.
 Norman Dennis Schlesser, Bastion of Empire: The Hudson Bay Company's Fort Umpqua, Being a Narrative of the Early Explorations and the Fur Trade in Douglas County. Oakland, OR: Oakland Printing Company, 1973.
 Russell C. Youmans, Douglas County, Oregon: Structure of a Timber County Economy. Corvallis, OR: Agricultural Experiment Station, Oregon State University, 1973.

External links

 City of Roseburg (official website)
 Entry for Roseburg in the Oregon Blue Book

 
Cities in Oregon
Cities in Douglas County, Oregon
County seats in Oregon
Populated places established in 1851
Micropolitan areas of Oregon
1851 establishments in Oregon Territory
Ammonium nitrate disasters